The Vrishabhavathi River is a minor river, a tributary of the Arkavathy, that flows through the south of the Indian city of Bangalore. The river was once so pristine that the water from it was used for drinking and used by the famous Gali Anjaneya temple but is now highly polluted due to pollutants from industrial, agricultural and domestic sources.

Etymology
Vrishabhavathi is derived from the Sanskrit word Vrishabha which refers to a bull. The river is believed to originate at the feet of the monolithic Nandi statue at the Big Bull Temple in Basavanagudi, hence giving it the name Vrishabhavathi.

Course

The origin of the river is near the Dakshinamukha Nandi Tirtha or the Kadu Malleshwara Temple in Malleswaram, and it flows through major areas like Nayandahalli, Rajarajeshwari Nagar and Kengeri. The river can be seen near the Mantri Mall Malleswaram, Magadi Road and Mysore Road metro stations. The river culminates in a reservoir named after itself Vrishabhavathi Reservoir near Bidadi. It joins Arkavathy River near Kanakapura as a tributary.

A smaller stream of the river originates near Bugle Rock in Basavanagudi, and joins the main river near Mysore Road.

Religious significance 
There are several temples throughout the course of the river. Some of the well-known temples along the banks on the Vrishabhavathi are Dodda Ganesha and the Dodda Basava Temple, Gali Hanumantha Temple, Gavi Gangadhareshwara temple and the Kadu Malleshwara Temple. The Gali Hanumantha Temple is over 600 years old, constructed in 1425 by Sri Vyasaraya of Channapattana who was a Rajaguru of Vijayanagara Empire. The temple was constructed on the confluence of two rivers – Vrishabhavathi and Paschimavahini. The Ishwara Temple at Kengeri dates back to 1050 AD.

Pollution and current concerns 
The river is highly polluted due to pollutants from industrial, agricultural and domestic sources. It is said to be dark, smelly and frothy due to "untreated or badly treated domestic sewage that goes into the river."

In 2005, the then Chief Minister of Karnataka, Dharam Singh proposed to remodel the river valley to include widening of the river, and adopt measures to prevent  inundation.

References 

Rivers of Karnataka
Geography of Bangalore
Rivers of India